Pelagonia is a geographical region of Macedonia named after the ancient kingdom. Ancient Pelagonia roughly corresponded to the present-day municipalities of Bitola, Prilep, Mogila, Novaci, Kruševo, and Krivogaštani in North Macedonia and to the municipalities of Florina, Amyntaio and Prespes in Greece.

History

In antiquity, Pelagonia was roughly bounded by Paeonia to the north and east, Lynkestis and Almopia to the south and Illyria to the west; and was inhabited by the Pelagones, an ancient Greek tribe of Upper Macedonia, who were centered at the Pelagonian plain and belonged to the Molossian tribal state or koinon. The region was annexed to the Macedonian kingdom during the 4th century BC and became one of its administrative provinces. In medieval times, when the names of Lynkestis and Orestis had become obsolete, Pelagonia acquired a broader meaning. This is why the Battle of Pelagonia (1259) between Byzantines and Latins includes also the current Kastoria regional unit and ancient Orestis.

Strabo calls Pelagonia by the name Tripolitis and names only one ancient city of the supposed three in the region; Azorus. Two notable Pelagonians include the mythological Pelagon, the eponym of the region, who, according to Greek mythology, was son of the river-god Axius (modern Axios or Vardar river) and father of the Paeonian Asteropaeus in Homer's Iliad. The second one is Menelaus of Pelagonia (ca. 360 BC) who, according to Bosworth, fled his kingdom when it was annexed by Philip II, finding refuge and citizenship in Athens.

Today, Pelagonia is a plain shared between North Macedonia  and the Greek region of Macedonia. It incorporates the southern cities of Bitola and Prilep in North Macedonia and the northwestern city of Florina in Greece; it is also the location of Medžitlija-Niki, a key border crossing between the two countries. Many Mycenaean objects have been found in the area, such as the double axe, later found in Mycenae and are exhibited in the Museum of Bitola.

Environment

Important Bird Area
A 137,000 ha tract of the plain has been designated an Important Bird Area (IBA) by BirdLife International because it supports populations of ferruginous ducks, white storks, Dalmatian pelicans, Eurasian thick-knees, little owls, Eurasian scops owls, European rollers, lesser kestrels and lesser grey shrikes.

See also
List of Ancient Greek tribes
Pelagonia statistical region

References

External links
 Pelagonian margins in central Evia island (Greece)
The oldest rocks of Greece: first evidence for a Precambrian terrane within the Pelagonian Zone
The ancient city of Pelagonia in the historical and epigraphic monuments

 
Upper Macedonia
Plains of Greece
Plains of Europe
Ancient Macedonia
Geography of North Macedonia
Bitola Municipality
Resen Municipality
Landforms of Florina (regional unit)
Landforms of Western Macedonia
Prilep Municipality
Geography of ancient Macedonia
Important Bird Areas of North Macedonia